The Cloonmorris Ogham Stone is an ancient monument at Saint Michael's Church, Bornacoola, County Leitrim, in Ireland.

Description
It is the only Ogham inscribed stone to be recorded in County Leitrim. First examined by Mac Neill in 1909, the stone then marked the Kellagher family burial plot "opposite the middle of the eastern gable of the ruin" of Cloonmorris church.

The defaced inscription makes accurate reading difficult. Korlev interpreted the inscription as "" while Gippert (1978) suggested the inscription was "" marking the genealogy ?

MacNeill thought the stone was probably the memorial of one . In Wales the name  occurs on a British-Latin inscription at Parcau near Whitland in Carmarthenshire, and is believed to identify a person of Gaelic, rather than Brythonic, origin. Scholars noted the Cloonmorris is "hardly a stone's throw from the boundary" between Longford and Leitrim, the stone standing inside the historic Conmhaícne territory once separating the Kingdom of Meath from Connacht.

 the stone was moved and enclosed on a pedestal near the churchyard entrance, but in doing so was placed into an inverted (top-down) position.

See also

Dungummin Ogham Stone

Notes and references

Notes

Citations

References

External links 
 Megalithic monuments of Ireland

Archaeological sites in County Leitrim
Conmaicne Maigh Rein